Diego Andrés de Gregorio Contreras (born 6 September 1986) is a Chilean former footballer who played as a striker.

Career
De Gregorio started his career in 2004 with Audax Italiano. In 2007, he had a successful spell with Deportes Melipilla before returning to Audax Italiano. Next, he moved to Romania and joined Pandurii Târgu Jiu as a free agent in 2008.

His last club was Cobreloa.

Personal life
He is the younger brother of the former footballer Pascual de Gregorio and uncle of Pascual Patricio, son of Pascual Sr., a footballer who has played at lower categories of both Chilean and Italian football.

Honours
 Copa Chile Top Goalscorer: 2012–13

References

External links
 BDFA profile

1986 births
Living people
Chilean people of Italian descent
Footballers from Santiago
Chilean footballers
Chilean expatriate footballers
Audax Italiano footballers
Deportes Melipilla footballers
CS Pandurii Târgu Jiu players
Rangers de Talca footballers
San Marcos de Arica footballers
Lota Schwager footballers
A.C. Barnechea footballers
Unión Temuco footballers
San Antonio Unido footballers
Trasandino footballers
Santiago Morning footballers
Cobreloa footballers
Chilean Primera División players
Primera B de Chile players
Liga I players
Segunda División Profesional de Chile players
Chilean expatriate sportspeople in Romania
Expatriate footballers in Romania
Association football forwards